Shree Sarasswathi Vidhyaah Mandheer (SSVM) Institutions are groups of residential co-educational schools based in India.  It offers classes from Kindergarten to grade 12 based on providing a range of curriculums in Central Board of Secondary Education, Council for the Indian School Certificate Examinations, Cambridge International, International Baccalaureate, State board and National Institute of Open Schooling across its eight campuses in Coimbatore, Mettupalayam and Uppilipalayam. It was established in 1998 as a primary school by educationalist Dr Manimekalai Mohan.

CBSE School maintains a strength of 2000 students in the school and a teacher-student ratio of 1:25

The other institutions under SSVM Institutions include SSVM World School, SSVM School of Excellence, SSVM World School - Cambridge, SSVM Open schooling, SSVM Prepversity for competitive exams, SSVM heritage school, RUH Early Years and SSVM Matriculation school.

Curriculum 
CBSE Curriculum with Tamil, Hindi and French offered as second languages in the school. The School prepares students for the AISSE and AISSCE examination under the CBSE curriculum. It offers Science, Commerce and Humanities streams in Senior secondary. The school also offers the opportunity for students to attempt the National Institute of open Schooling NIOS for both the 10th and the 12th standards both as an in-house and a long distance program.

Clubs in school 

 Eco-Warriors – Nature and Sustainability Club
 Groovin’ Gourmet -Healthy Cookery Club
 Curvy Tails – Pets Club
 The Machine Learners – Robotics & AI Club
 SSVM Entrepreneurs Club
 Mathletes- Maths Club
 Artsy Lens Club – Photography
 Impacteers – Social Impact Club
  Agro Club
  Creative Pod – Art Club
  Get Lit! – Literary Club
  Ensemble – Music Club
  Dance Crew 
  Digital Destination – IT & Coding Club, Media Inc.
  Linguists – Foreign Language Club
  Improv Act Club – Drama & Theatre Club
  Volta Scientists
  Young Women's Society
  Fossil Finders – Archaeology Club
  Vedic Society- Chanting

Sports 
  Athletics
  Archery
  Basketball
  Handball
  Badminton
  Fives football
  Volleyball
  Martial arts
  Skating
  Squash

Extra-curricular activities 
 National Cadet Corps
 The Bharat Scouts and Guides
 Road traffic safety Patrol
 School band

See also
 International Community School and Junior College

External links
SSVM Institution's Official website

References 

Educational institutions established in 1998
Cambridge schools in India
Schools in India
International schools in India
Boarding schools in Tamil Nadu
High schools and secondary schools in Tamil Nadu
Education in Coimbatore district
Primary schools in Tamil Nadu
Schools in Coimbatore